The Team Media War (TMW) is a government organization affiliated with the Popular Mobilization Forces and the Iraqi Council of Ministers was founded after ISIS entered Mosul and after the declaration of Jihad from the religious authority Ali al-Sistani.

History
After ISIS entered and occupied the city of Mosul in 2014, Ali al-Sistani issued a fatwa against ISIS; the Popular Mobilization Forces (PMF) was established as a result. A few days after PMF was established, a Team Media War was formed by the Iraqi government and affiliated with followers of President Haider al-Abadi, where it was adopted as a means of transmitting the events of the wars fought by the Popular Mobilization Forces. The main purpose of the formation of Team Media War was to spread propaganda by trying to influence people's opinions of PMF as some of the organisation's component militias are considered terrorist groups by some states, while others have been accused of sectarian violence.

See also
 Hadi Al-Amiri
 Abu Mahdi al-Muhandis
 Qais Khazali

References

External links
 * Official Website

Local government organizations
Government agencies established in 2014
2014 establishments in Iraq
Popular Mobilization Forces
War in Iraq (2013–2017)
Paramilitary forces of Iraq